The Chinese Ambassador to Rwanda is the official representative of the People's Republic of China to the Republic of Rwanda.

List of representatives

See also
China–Rwanda relations

References 

 
Rwanda
China